Ankylomyrma is a genus of large arboreal ants in the subfamily Agroecomyrmecinae. It contains the single species Ankylomyrma coronacantha, the sole member of the tribe Ankylomyrmini. The genus is known from Africa. Nothing is known about their biology. The genus was moved from the subfamily Myrmicinae to Agroecomyrmecinae in 2014.

References

External links

Agroecomyrmecinae
Monotypic ant genera
Hymenoptera of Africa